América de Cali Femenino, commonly known as América Femenino, is the women's association football section of América de Cali based in the city of Cali, Colombia. They participate in Liga Profesional Femenina, the highest category of women's football, organized by Dimayor. Like their male counterpart, they play their home games at the Estadio Olímpico Pascual Guerrero.

History 
The team was officially introduced on 15 September 2016 in the city of Cali, during the introduction of the first two hirings, players Catalina Usme and Nicole Regnier; Marcela Gómez was in charge of the idea of creating a women's team linked to America; she would become the first president of the women's team.

Thus, America would be linked to the project of promoting women's soccer in the country, both at the continental level and also at the world level.

Stadium

Current squad 
As of 19 Jul 2022

Honours 
Liga Femenina Profesional:
Winners (1): 2019, 2022
Runners-up (1): 2020

Copa Libertadores Femenina:
Runners-up (1): 2020
Third place (2): 2019, 2022

References

América de Cali
Women's football clubs in Colombia
Association football clubs established in 2016
2016 establishments in Colombia